Lypets'ka Polyana (Ukrainian and Rusyn: Ли́пе́цька Поля́на;) is a village in Khust Raion of Zakarpattia Oblast, part of the Transcarpathian region of Ukraine.

The center of the village council, located on the right bank of the river Rika is 22 km from the district center and the railway station Khust, on the highway Khust - Svalyava.  The roadway T0712 runs through the village.  This road connects with the M06 highway in Svaliava and the P21 highway near Khust.

The population at the 2001 census was 2,965 people.

History

The first mention of Lypets'ka Polyana dates back to 1653. It has been historically an ethnically Rusyn village. During the time that the area was part of the Kingdom of Hungary, the village was located in the district of Dolha of the Máramaros County.

In March–April 1919, Soviet power existed in the village. In 1932, the organization of the HR Committee began to operate, whose first secretary was I. Perez. After the seizure of village from the Axis October 24, 1944), 23 residents voluntarily entered the Red Army, and 9 were part of the 1st Czechoslovak Army Corps. 2 of them were awarded with orders and medals of the USSR, 18 gave their lives in battles for freedom and independence of the Motherland. In the village there is a monument to fellow villagers, who died in the struggle against the Nazis.

In 1930, the Jewish population was 239. With the Hungarian occupation of the region in March, 1939, Jews were forcefully removed from their occupations. From 1940 to 1941, Jews from the village were drafted into forced labor battalions and others were drafted for service on the Eastern front, where most died.  By 1941, the Jewish population had increased to 280 and Jewish families without Hungarian citizenship were expelled to Nazi occupied Ukrainian territory, to Kamenets-Podolski, and murdered there. The remaining Jews of Lypets'ka Polyana were deported to Auschwitz late May, 1944.

Notable People
 Vasyl Khimyshynets- Ukrainian poet

Gallery

See also
Zakarpattia Oblast

References

Carpatho-Ukraine
Villages in Khust Raion
Holocaust locations in Ukraine